The city of Ottawa, Canada held municipal elections on December 1, 1952.

Mayor of Ottawa

Referendum

Ottawa Board of Control
(4 elected)

Ottawa City Council

(2 elected from each ward)

References
Ottawa Citizen, December 2, 1952

Municipal elections in Ottawa
Ottawa
1950s in Ottawa
1952 in Ontario
December 1952 events in Canada